Stephen Keysuk Kim is a South Korean marketing academic whose research interests include new forms of interfirm governance, interfirm control systems, and decision rights in marketing and sales. He is the Raisbeck Endowed Professor in Business at the department of marketing at Iowa State University's Debbie and Jerry Ivy College of Business.

Academic career 
Upon completing his Bachelor of Science in business administration at Korea University in 1984, Kim pursued a Master of Business Administration specializing in marketing. After completing the MBA program in 1987, Kim continued his doctoral studies in marketing at the University of Southern California, while working as a teaching assistant in South Korea and as an instructor in the US. In 1993, he completed his PhD.

Kim was an assistant professor at Baruch College between 1993 and 1997, then held the same rank at Oregon State University until 2001, when he was promoted to associate professor. In 2006, he joined the Iowa State University faculty. He was promoted to full professor in 2012, where since 2017 he is the Raisbeck Endowed Professor in Business.

Kim has authored several dozen book chapters and articles in peer-reviewed academic journals, which have been cited over 3300 times, giving him an h-index of 22.

Selected works
The following articles have each been cited over 300 times:
Loyalty: The Influences of Satisfaction and Brand Community Integration. Journal of Marketing Theory and Practice (2003): 1-11. With James H. McAlexander and Scott D. Roberts.
On Interfirm Power, Channel Climate, and Solidarity in Industrial Distributor-Supplier Dyads. Journal of the Academy of Marketing Science 28.3 (2000): 388-405.
Business Model Innovation Performance: When Does Adding a New Business Model Benefit an Incumbent?. Strategic Entrepreneurship Journal 9.1 (2015): 34-57. With Sungwook Min.

References

Iowa State University faculty
Living people
Oregon State University faculty
University of Southern California alumni
Korea University alumni
Marketing theorists
Baruch College faculty
South Korean academics
Year of birth missing (living people)